This is a partial and incomplete list of assets of community value registered under the Localism Act 2011 by local authorities in England. Owners of these properties must inform the local authority if they wish to sell the asset and should a community organisation wish to purchase it a moratorium period of six months is triggered to allow them the opportunity to raise sufficient money.

Cambridgeshire
Five local authorities maintain of assets of community value in Cambridgeshire; Cambridge City Council, South Cambridgeshire District Council, East Cambridgeshire District Council, Fenland District Council and Huntingdonshire District Council.

Pubs

Other facilities

Cheshire
Four local authorities maintain of assets of community value in Cheshire; Cheshire East Council, Cheshire West and Chester Council, Halton Borough Council and Warrington Borough Council

Pubs

Other facilities

London

Pubs
The Ivy House, pub, Southwark London Borough Council
The Old White Bear, (Public House dating back to 1704), Well Road, Hampstead village, London, NW3 1LJ.
The Sir Richard Steele, Haverstock Hill, Hampstead, NW3 4RL, London.
The Wheatsheaf Upper Tooting Road, London SW17
The Trafalgar Arms, Upper Tooting Rd, London SW17
The Truscott Arms Maida Vale, London NW8
The Chesham Arms, Mehetabel Rd, Hackney E8, London
The Lord Rookwood, Cann Hall Rd E11, London.
The Antwerp Arms, Tottenham N10, London.
The Landseer Arms, Upper Holloway N19, London.

Other facilities
Gala Bingo Club formerly Granada cinema, Tooting
Former Embassy Cinema, currently known as Mayfair Venue, Chadwell Heath, Greater London, RM6 4BD
Heaven Nightclub Heaven (nightclub)

Sussex

Pubs
The following pubs in Sussex (including some which have closed down and been converted to other uses) were registered as ACVs as of 1 October 2015:

The following current and former pubs in the city of Brighton and Hove have also been listed as ACVs: 

Also registered as an asset of community value is the green and playground in the suburb of Westdene.

References

Sources

Assets of community value